The mixed 10 metre air pistol team competition at the 2018 Asian Games in Palembang, Indonesia took place on 19 August at the Jakabaring International Shooting Range.

Schedule
All times are Western Indonesia Time (UTC+07:00)

Records

Results

Qualification

Final

References

 Results

External links
Schedule

Mixed 10 metre air pistol team